El Sereno is a statue installed at Glorieta de los Insurgentes, a roundabout in Avenida de los Insurgentes, in Cuauhtémoc, Mexico City. The statue was designed by Víctor Manuel Villareal and was placed in 1992. The statue features a watchman, formerly a law enforcement position. When it was unveiled, El Sereno had a lamp and a plaque that were removed at some point.

References

1992 sculptures
Monuments and memorials in Mexico City
Outdoor sculptures in Mexico City
Sculptures of men in Mexico
Statues in Mexico City
Vandalized works of art in Mexico